Ab Barik (also Romanized as Āb Bārīk; also known as Meyr and Mīr) is a village in Zirtang Rural District, Kunani District, Kuhdasht County, Lorestan Province, Iran. At the 2006 census, its population was 40, in 6 families.

References 

Towns and villages in Kuhdasht County